Lozania is a genus of Lacistemataceae consisting of five species:

References

Lacistemataceae
Malpighiales genera